Germanium selenide is a chemical compound with the formula GeSe. It exists as black crystalline powder having orthorhombic (distorted NaCl-type) crystal symmetry; at temperatures ~650 °C, it transforms into the cubic NaCl structure. GeSe has been shown to have stereochemically active Ge 4s lone pairs that are responsible for the distorted structure and the relatively high position of the valence band maximum with respect to the vacuum level.

To grow GeSe crystals, GeSe powder is vaporized at the hot end of a sealed ampule and allowed to condense at the cold end. Usual crystals are small and show signs of irregular growth, caused mainly by convective motion in the gaseous medium. However, GeSe grown under condition of zero-gravity and reduced convection aboard the Skylab are ~10 times larger than Earth-grown crystals, and are free from visual defects.

References

Germanium(II) compounds
Selenides